The Women's 20 km Race Walking event at the 2003 Pan American Games took place on Friday August 6, 2003.

Medalists

Records

Results

See also
2003 Race Walking Year Ranking
2003 World Championships in Athletics – Women's 20 kilometres walk
Athletics at the 2004 Summer Olympics – Women's 20 kilometre walk

References
Results

Walk, Women's 20
2003
2003 in women's athletics